Some Lessons Learned is the fourth album by singer and actress Kristin Chenoweth.

Overview
The country pop disc was released on September 13, 2011. The lead single, "I Want Somebody (Bitch About)" was released on May 31, 2011.  The album contains songs by Diane Warren, Dolly Parton and Lady Antebellum's Hillary Scott, among others. Chenoweth co-wrote two of the songs, including one entitled "What Would Dolly Do".  "Lessons Learned" was previously recorded by Carrie Underwood for her debut album, Some Hearts.  The album is produced by popular music producer and Canadian Music Hall of Fame entree, Bob Ezrin. She recorded it in Nashville, Tennessee in the summer of 2011. An MP3 release was also made available on September 13, 2011. She has said the album is about learning from life lessons. Chenoweth made her Grand Ole Opry debut during the promotion of the album.

Track listing

Chart performance

References

Kristin Chenoweth albums
2011 albums
Country pop albums
Albums produced by Bob Ezrin